Pedro Manuel Oliveira Martins (born 16 June 1988), commonly known as Coelho, is a Portuguese futsal player who is a universal player for Braga/AAUM and the Portugal national team.

References

External links

1988 births
Living people
Portuguese men's futsal players
AR Freixieiro players
People from Gondomar, Portugal
Sportspeople from Porto District